Burgos, officially the Municipality of Burgos (Surigaonon: Lungsod nan Burgos), is a 6th class municipality in the province of Surigao del Norte, Philippines. According to the 2020 census, it has a population of 4,185 people.

It is the smallest municipality in the province, both in population and area. Burgos is one of the two northernmost towns of Siargao Island. The other is municipality of Santa Monica.

Geography

Barangays
Burgos is politically subdivided into 6 barangays.
 Baybay
 Bitaug 
 Matin-ao 
 Poblacion 1 
 Poblacion 2 
 San Mateo

Climate

Demographics

Economy

References

External links
 Burgos Profile at PhilAtlas.com
   Burgos Profile at the DTI Cities and Municipalities Competitive Index
 [ Philippine Standard Geographic Code]
 Philippine Census Information
 Local Governance Performance Management System

Municipalities of Surigao del Norte